Andrew Christopher Fabian  (born 20 February 1948) is a British astronomer and astrophysicist. He was Director of the Institute of Astronomy, University of Cambridge from 2013 to 2018.  He was a Royal Society Research Professor at the Institute of Astronomy, Cambridge from 1982 to 2013, and Vice-Master of Darwin College, Cambridge from 1997 to 2012. He served as president of the Royal Astronomical Society from May 2008 through to 2010.

Education
Fabian was educated at King's College London (BSc, Physics) and the Mullard Space Science Laboratory at University College London (PhD).

Career and research
Fabian was Gresham Professor of Astronomy at Gresham College, a position in which he delivered free public lectures within the City of London between 1982 and 1984. He was editor-in-chief of the astronomy journal Monthly Notices of the Royal Astronomical Society from 1994–2008.

His areas of research include galaxy clusters, active galactic nuclei, strong gravity, black holes and the X-ray background. He has also worked on X-ray binaries, neutron stars and supernova remnants in the past. Much of his research involves X-ray astronomy and high energy astrophysics. His notable achievements include his involvement in the discovery of broad iron lines emitted from active galactic nuclei, for which he was jointly awarded the Bruno Rossi Prize. He is author of over 1000 refereed articles and head of the X-ray astronomy group at the Institute of Astronomy.

Awards and honours
Fabian was awarded the Dannie Heineman Prize for Astrophysics by the American Astronomical Society in 2008, the Gold Medal of the Royal Astronomical Society in 2012, and the Kavli Prize for Astrophysics in 2020.

In 2016 he was elected as a foreign associate of the National Academy of Sciences and awarded the Bruce Gold Medal
by the Astronomical Society of the Pacific.

In August 2020 Fabian was a guest on the BBC Radio 4 programme 'The Life Scientific'.

References

External links

1948 births
Living people
People from Daventry
Academics of the University of Cambridge
Alumni of King's College London
Alumni of University College London
21st-century British astronomers
Fellows of the Royal Society
Fellows of Darwin College, Cambridge
Foreign associates of the National Academy of Sciences
Officers of the Order of the British Empire
Professors of Gresham College
Presidents of the Royal Astronomical Society
Winners of the Dannie Heineman Prize for Astrophysics
Kavli Prize laureates in Astrophysics
Recipients of the Gold Medal of the Royal Astronomical Society